Andy T. Tran, born in Houston, TX on October 6, 1983, is an American actor. He is best known for his role as Lt. Andy Chung in the TNT series, The Last Ship, executive-produced by Michael Bay.

Career 
Tran graduated from the University of Texas at Austin in 2006 with a Bachelor's degree in Economics, minoring in Mathematics. While in school, he wrote, acted, and directed award-winning comedy shows in university-wide talent competitions that led him to become a sketch player for multiple comedy troupes in Austin, TX from 2007-2009. He then segued into film acting, making his television debut in NBC Chase, Season 1, Episode 11 - "Betrayed". Tran has since appeared in FOX Bones, CBS NCIS: Los Angeles, CBS CSI: NY, Nickelodeon Big Time Rush, and ABC Reckless. He has also starred in award-winning films such as Post-Racial  and "Cabernet", in which Tran was also nominated best performer.

References

External links 

Andy T. Tran on Twitter
Andy T. Tran on Facebook

Living people
American male television actors
1983 births
Male actors from Houston
University of Texas at Austin alumni
American male film actors